Mark Allen Bradley (born December 3, 1956, Elizabethtown, Kentucky) is a former Major League Baseball outfielder.

The Elizabethtown High School graduate was originally an infielder when he was drafted by the Los Angeles Dodgers in the first round of the 1975 Major League Baseball draft. His only hit in six at bats was a double off the Houston Astros' Billy Smith.

Receiving a second September call up that year, he was 1-for-3 with a run scored.

Bradley's name came up several times at the Winter meetings that year. At one point, he and pitchers Burt Hooton and Dave Stewart and minor league pitcher Orel Hershiser were traded to the Texas Rangers for catcher Jim Sundberg, but Sundberg vetoed the deal.

In Spring training , Bradley was hitting .353 when he was traded to the injury riddled New York Mets for two minor league pitchers.

He was 0-for his first-8 at bats as a Met before getting his first hit on May 10. He went 3-for-5 with a double, a stolen base and a run in a 5-4 extra innings loss to the Astros.

He hit his first major league home run as a pinch hitter on June 2 off Fernando Valenzuela to send that game to extra innings. The Mets lost in fourteen innings, giving them a record of 16-30, and prompting manager George Bamberger to resign after the game. "I've probably suffered enough." He saw more limited playing time under new manager Frank Howard. In his only full season in the majors, Bradley batted .202 with three home runs and five RBIs.

On February 22, he was released by the Mets. He batted .242 with one home run and sixteen RBIs for the California League's San Jose Bees that season before retiring.

References

, or The Ultimate Mets Database

1956 births
Living people
African-American baseball players
Albuquerque Dukes players
Baseball players from Kentucky
Bellingham Dodgers players
Danville Dodgers players
Lodi Dodgers players
Los Angeles Dodgers players
Major League Baseball outfielders
Navegantes del Magallanes players
American expatriate baseball players in Venezuela
New York Mets players
People from Elizabethtown, Kentucky
San Antonio Dodgers players
San Jose Bees players
Tigres de Aragua players
21st-century African-American people
20th-century African-American sportspeople